The AFC U-20 Futsal Asian Cup, previously the AFC U-20 Futsal Championship, is the premier youth futsal competition off the Asian Football Confederation It was first held in 2017 and played biennially. From 2021, the tournament to be rebranded "AFC U-20 Futsal Asian Cup".

Format

History

Summaries

 2021 AFC U-20 Futsal Asian Cup was cancelled due to COVID-19 pandemic.

Summary (2017-2019)

Performance of the nations

* = hosts

Medal summary

Participating by teams 

Legend

 – Champions
 – Runners-up
 – Third place
 – Fourth place

QF – Quarter-finals
GS – Group stage
q – Qualified
 — Hosts

 •  – Did not qualify
 ×  – Did not enter
 ×  – Withdrew before qualification / Banned

References

External links
, the-AFC.com

 
Asian Football Confederation competitions for national teams
Futsal competitions in Asia
2016 establishments in Asia